Albert Heckles Oswald (Hetton-le-Hole, 1879 – 1929) was an English composer and organist.

Albert Oswald was born to Robert Oswald, a shoemaker, and his wife Jane Oswald (née Thompson).  He composed many pieces for piano in light classical style, in the heyday of Edwardian Salon music. He was well known for his Wright Pianoforte Tutor.

Selected works

Tutors
 The Wright Pianoforte Tutor
 The Wright Edition, Albert H Oswald's First Book of 36 Melodious Studies for the Pianoforte

Other

References

External links
 
 "Albert H Oswald, Composer and Organist – Thornley", Durham County Council

1879 births
1929 deaths
19th-century English musicians
19th-century British male musicians
20th-century English composers
20th-century British male musicians
20th-century British musicians
English classical organists
English classical pianists
Male classical pianists
English Romantic composers
British male organists
People from Hetton-le-Hole
Musicians from Tyne and Wear
Male classical organists